Western Beat is the second studio album by Kevin Welch, as Kevin Welch @nd The Overtones, released in 1992 on Reprise Records. This was Welch's last album for Reprise, before he went on to co-found Dead Reckoning Records in 1994 with fellow musicians Kieran Kane, Mike Henderson, Tammy Rogers, and Harry Stinson.

Critical reception

Thom Owens of AllMusic calls Western Beat "a fresh, lively sound, supported by a number of first-rate songs."

Allen Howie of Louisville Music News concludes his review by saying, "Credit must be given to the Overtones, who sound like a real band throughout, not just some amalgam of studio vets. Their music is the heart of Western Beat, and Welch's dead-on writing and singing are its soul."

Daniel Durchholz of RiverFront Times writes, "Maybe it's better if Welch's music is just allowed to speak for itself, which it has on four dazzling albums, starting with his self-titled debut in 1990 and 1992's aforementioned Western Beat."

Geoffrey Himes of the Washington Post wasn't very impressed with Western Beat and writes, "Welch's melodies and rhythms are serviceable in a derivative Nashville sort of way, but his songs sink on the strength of the lyrics."

Track listing

Musicians
Kevin Welch: Vocals, Guitar, National Steel Guitar
Mike Henderson: Acoustic & Electric Guitar, Steel Guitar
David Grissom: Electric Guitar
Kieran Kane: Mandolin, Vocals
Biff Watson: Keyboards, Acoustic & Electric Guitar
Glenn Worf: Bass, String Bass
Harry Stinson: Drums, Percussion, Vocals
Ashley Cleveland: Background Vocals
Kim Fleming: Background Vocals
Vicki Hampton: Background Vocals

Production
Harry Stinson: Producer
Kevin Welch: Producer
Peter Coleman: Engineer
Ron Keith: Photography
Laura LiPuma-Nash: Art Direction

All track information and credits were taken from the album's liner notes.

References

External links
Kevin Welch Official Site
Dead Reckoning Records Official Site

1992 albums
Reprise Records albums
Kevin Welch albums